Ryland Harp "Taffy" Milner (September 24, 1909 – June 16, 1999) was an American football and basketball coach. He was the ninth head football coach at Northwest Missouri State College–now known as Northwest Missouri State University— in Maryville, Missouri, serving for 21 seasons, from 1937 to 1957, and compiling a record of 91–62–13. Milner was the head basketball coach at Northwest Missouri State from 1943 to 1950, tallying a mark of 67–60. He was also the school's athletic director from 1958 to 1975.

Milner attended Classen High School in Oklahoma City, Oklahoma, where was coached by Henry Iba. Milner then attended Northwest Missouri State, where Iba has been appointed head basketball coach in 1929. Milner lettered in football and basketball each for four seasons at Northwest Missouri State. He played football as a quarterback and basketball as a guard. After graduating in 1933, Milner began his coaching career at Jackson High School in Jackson, Missouri, succeeding Wilbur Stalcup, a fellow Northwest Missouri State alum.

Milner died on June 16, 1999, in Maryville.

Head coaching record

College football

References

1909 births
1999 deaths
American football quarterbacks
American men's basketball players
Guards (basketball)
Northwest Missouri State Bearcats athletic directors
Northwest Missouri State Bearcats football coaches
Northwest Missouri State Bearcats football players
Northwest Missouri State Bearcats men's basketball coaches
Northwest Missouri State Bearcats men's basketball players
College golf coaches in the United States
College track and field coaches in the United States
High school basketball coaches in Missouri
High school football coaches in Missouri
Louisiana State University alumni
People from League City, Texas
Sportspeople from Oklahoma City
Coaches of American football from Oklahoma
Players of American football from Oklahoma
Basketball coaches from Oklahoma
Basketball players from Oklahoma
Classen School of Advanced Studies alumni